Potamonautes idjiwiensis is a species of crustacean in the family Potamonautidae. It is endemic to the island of Idjwi in Lake Kivu, the Democratic Republic of the Congo. Its natural habitats are streams and other freshwater habitats.

References

Potamoidea
Freshwater crustaceans of Africa
Arthropods of the Democratic Republic of the Congo
Endemic fauna of the Democratic Republic of the Congo
Crustaceans described in 1942
Taxonomy articles created by Polbot